Milakatong La or Menlakathong La is a historic mountain pass along the trade route between Tawang in India's Arunachal Pradesh and Tsona Dzong in Tibet's Shannan province via the valley of Tsona Chu.

Location

Following the valley upstream along Tsona Chu leads one to Tsona Dzong. Following it downstream leads one to the Tawang Chu river.

Other sources suggest a location near the 'Bum La' pass of Ludlow-Sherriff, described as being between "Tulung La and the Bhutan border". The McMahon Line map of 1914 places the Indo-Tibetan border along the mountain range on this axis (labelled "Menlakathong La range"):

This pass also leads to another branch valley of the Tsona Chu valley, which lies north of the border.
Both the passes were likely used for trade between Tawang and Tsona Dzong. This perhaps explains the confusion among sources.

Trade 
According to F. M. Bailey, there were two trade routes between Tawang and Tsona Dzong, one via Milakatong La and other via the Nyamjang Chu valley. On each of these roads, a Tsukang (Chukang) or a customs house was placed by the Tibetans and a tax of 10 per cent was collected on all merchandise brought from Tawang. However, there was no tax on articles carried from Tsona Dzong to Tawang.

See also 
 Bum La Pass
 Tawang Town
 Tawang Monastery
 Tawang district

Notes

References

Bibliography 
 

Mountain passes of Arunachal Pradesh